Ngo Wa Keng (born 2 August 1999) is a Macanese footballer who currently plays as a midfielder for Benfica (Macau) and the Macau national football team.

Career statistics

Club

Notes

International

International goals

Macau U23

References

1999 births
Living people
Macau footballers
Macau international footballers
Association football midfielders
Liga de Elite players